Whitesburg is an unincorporated community in eastern Hamblen County, Tennessee. The small, rural community is located along U.S. Route 11E. Whitesburg is bordered by Russellville on the west and Bulls Gap on the east. A U.S. post office and two schools, both parts of the Hamblen County school system, are located in Whitesburg.

Education
Whitesburg is home to two schools:
 Whitesburg Elementary
 East Ridge Middle School

Notable people
Reece Shipley (1921–1998), American country musician
Edward R. Talley Medal of Honor Winner WWI
Depending on the reference, Edward R. Talley was born on either September 6 or 8, 1890 in Russellville, Tennessee. He joined the United States Army from Russellville and after completing recruit training was sent to France where he distinguished himself in action near Ponchaux, France. He was a Sergeant, in Company L, 117th Infantry, 30th Division when he was awarded the Medal of Honor for his actions on October 7, 1918.

Talley died December 14, 1950, and is buried at Bent Creek Cemetery in Whitesburg, Tennessee.

References

Unincorporated communities in Hamblen County, Tennessee
Unincorporated communities in Tennessee